The Telkwa Range is a subrange of the Bulkley Ranges, located south of the junction of the Telkwa River and Bulkley River in northern British Columbia, Canada.

References

Telkwa Range in the Canadian Mountain Encyclopedia

Hazelton Mountains